A mousse ("foam") is a soft prepared food that incorporates air bubbles to give it a light and airy texture. Depending on preparation techniques, it can range from light and fluffy to creamy and thick. A mousse may be sweet or savoury.

Sweet mousses are typically made with whipped egg whites, whipped cream, or both, and flavored with one or more of chocolate, coffee, caramel, puréed fruits, or various herbs and spices, such as mint or vanilla. In the case of some chocolate mousses, egg yolks are often stirred into melted chocolate to give the final product a richer mouthfeel. Mousses are also typically chilled before being served, which gives them a denser texture. Additionally, mousses are often frozen into silicone molds and unmolded to give the mousse a defined shape. Sweetened mousse is served as a dessert or used as an airy cake filling. It is sometimes stabilized with gelatin.

Savoury mousses can be made from meat, fish, shellfish, foie gras, cheese, or vegetables. Hot mousses often get their light texture from the addition of beaten egg whites.

History

Various desserts consisting of whipped cream in pyramidal shapes with coffee, liqueurs, chocolate, fruits, and so on either in the mixture or poured on top were called crème en mousse 'cream in a foam', crème mousseuse 'foamy cream', mousse 'foam', and so on, as early as 1768.  Modern mousses are a continuation of this tradition.

Savoury mousse

Fish mousse with brown bread and butter was a popular meal of American cuisine and is still sometimes made as a party dip, although it is not as common as it was in the 1950s.

Gallery

See also

Bavarian cream
Flourless chocolate cake
Foam (culinary)
 Fruit whip
Mousseline sauce
Parfait

References

French desserts